Tabi are traditional Japanese socks.

Tabi may also be a romanisation of the Arabic word ʈābiʕ, meaning "follower", used in English to refer to:
Tabi‘un, generation of Muslims born after the death of Muhammad
Tabi‘ al-Tabi‘in, the generation which succeeded them

Tabi may also mean:
Tabi, Angola, town and commune in Bengo Province, Angola
Tabi Bonney, Togolese indie musician
William Etchu Tabi, Cameroonian footballer

Surnames of Cameroonian origin